Carlton Foster (August 26, 1826August 4, 1901) was an American businessman, Republican politician, and Wisconsin pioneer.  He was the 10th and 26th mayor of Oshkosh, Wisconsin, and served three terms in the Wisconsin State Assembly.

Biography

Carlton Foster was born in Essex County, New York, in August 1826.  He was raised on his father's farm and educated in the public schools of Essex and Clinton counties.  At age 20, he went to work as an apprentice millwright, and would remain in that profession for over a decade.

He moved to Oshkosh, Wisconsin, in September 1855, and made the city his primary residence for the rest of his life.  In 1859, he entered the lumber business and soon became regarded as one of the leading lumbermen in the city.  In 1870, he built a factory under the firm name Carlton Foster & Co., which became a major manufacturer for sashes, doors, and blinds.  Foster remained president of this company until his death.

Through his business activity, Foster became involved in local politics as a member of the Republican Party of Wisconsin.  He was elected mayor of Oshkosh in 1865, and was re-elected in 1866.  He was elected to the Wisconsin State Assembly in 1872, 1873, and 1882.  His last campaign for office was in 1886, when he was elected to his third and final term as mayor, defeating incumbent Democrat Andrew Haben.

About May 1, 1901, Foster became severely ill and his health remained fragile after the acute illness passed.  In June, he decided to live full-time aboard his beloved steam yacht, the Anna M., believing that the fresh air on the lake and river would improve his health.  His family went to live with him on the boat, but his health continued to deteriorate.  They steamed back to Oshkosh and docked at the Oshkosh Yacht Club, where medical assistance could be brought onboard.  Foster died aboard his boat on August 4, 1901.

Personal life and family
Carlton Foster married Sibyl S. Storrs of Vermont on June 20, 1854.  They had at least three children, though one died in childhood.  Their son, Charles H. Foster served on the Oshkosh city council and the city police and fire board.

Electoral history

Wisconsin Assembly (1872, 1873)

| colspan="6" style="text-align:center;background-color: #e9e9e9;"| General Election, November 5, 1872

| colspan="6" style="text-align:center;background-color: #e9e9e9;"| General Election, November 4, 1873

Wisconsin Assembly (1882)

| colspan="6" style="text-align:center;background-color: #e9e9e9;"| General Election, November 7, 1882

Oshkosh Mayor (1886)

| colspan="6" style="text-align:center;background-color: #e9e9e9;"| General Election, April 6, 1886

References

External links

1826 births
1901 deaths
People from Essex County, New York
Politicians from Oshkosh, Wisconsin
Businesspeople from Wisconsin
Wisconsin city council members
Mayors of places in Wisconsin
Republican Party members of the Wisconsin State Assembly
19th-century American politicians
19th-century American businesspeople